On July 30, 2010 a 5.6 magnitude earthquake occurred in  Razavi Khorasan province, Iran.

Casualties
Iranian media reported at least 170 people were injured as a result of the earthquake, while the Iranian Red Crescent Society reported more than 150 injured. The organization said all injured were treated on the scene, except two people who were hospitalized in Mashhad.

Damage
The earthquake reportedly caused serious damage in dozens of villages. Widespread outages were also reported.

See also
List of earthquakes in 2010
List of earthquakes in Iran

References

External links
M5.5 - northeastern Iran – United States Geological Survey

Iran 7-2010
History of Razavi Khorasan Province
2010 in Iran
2010 Razavi
July 2010 events in Iran
2010 disasters in Iran